Um Hong-gil (born September 14, 1960) is a South Korean mountaineer.

Climbing career
He has led many South Korean summer expeditions to Mount Aconcagua in Argentina, where he has climbed South America's highest mountain several times.

In 2000, he climbed K2 (8,611m), which meant his team completed the mission to go up 14 peaks higher than 8,000 meters in altitude within 12 years.
He tried to climb Mount Everest in September 2005, but failed. He tried again three years later and his attempt was successful. He also carried out a mission on Kangchenjunga.

Um Hong-gil has reached the summit of all 14 eight-thousand-meter peaks in the world and is the first person to climb the 16 highest points on Earth.

He was awarded the Himalayan Crown when he completed the 14 highest peaks in 2001. He is the first South Korean and the eleventh climber in the world to hold this distinction.

He led successful expeditions up Everest in 1988, 2002, and 2003.  He has climbed both the North and South Sides of the Everest. Um Hong-gil has stood on top of Everest three times.

On December 13, 2007, he succeeded in reaching the summit of Vinson Massif, the highest peak of Antarctica.

The film 히말라야/The Himalayas was released on December 16, 2015. It was directed by Lee Seok-hoon and starred Hwang Jung-min in the role of Um. The film is based on Um's life, primarily focusing on his mentorship of two other climbers who later died during an ascent. The film beat the box office battle with Star Wars: The Force Awakens in South Korea, released on the same weekend.

Charitable activities

Um Hong-gil invested his time with The Beautiful Foundation in his native South Korea. He helped start the program "Gil Sarang Fund" (Loving the Road) in order to support cultural activities for handicapped people. He received an honorary citizenship of Nepal for his philanthropy.

Filmography

Television shows

Ambassadorship 
 7th Ulju Mountain Film Festival Ambassador (2022) with  Park Gyuri

See also
List of climbers, alpinists and mountaineers
List of Mount Everest summiters by number of times to the summit

References

1960 births
Living people
South Korean mountain climbers
Summiters of all 14 eight-thousanders
Hankuk University of Foreign Studies alumni
South Korean summiters of Mount Everest
Honorary Citizens of Nepal
Republic of Korea Navy personnel
Yeongwol Eom clan